Matthew Orzech (born April 12, 1995) is an American football long snapper for the Green Bay Packers of the National Football League (NFL). He was signed by the Baltimore Ravens as an undrafted free in 2019 after playing college football at Azusa Pacific. He has also played for the Jacksonville Jaguars, Miami Dolphins, and Tennessee Titans.

Professional career

Baltimore Ravens
Orzech was signed by the Baltimore Ravens as an undrafted free agent in 2019. He was waived on August 30, 2019.

Jacksonville Jaguars
On September 1, 2019, Orzech was claimed off waivers by the Jacksonville Jaguars.

On September 5, 2020, Orzech was waived by the Jaguars.

Miami Dolphins
On September 10, 2020, Orzech was signed to the Miami Dolphins practice squad.

Tennessee Titans
On November 5, 2020, Orzech was signed by the Tennessee Titans off the Dolphins' practice squad. Orzech was waived by the Titans on November 30, 2020, and re-signed to the practice squad two days later. He was signed to a futures contract on January 11, 2021. On May 10, 2021, Orzech was waived by the Titans.

Los Angeles Rams
Orzech was claimed off waivers by the Los Angeles Rams on May 11, 2021. Orzech became a Super Bowl champion when the Rams defeated the Cincinnati Bengals in Super Bowl LVI.

Green Bay Packers
Orzech signed with the Green Bay Packers on March 17, 2023.

References

External links
Green Bay Packers bio
Azusa Pacific bio

Living people
1995 births
American football long snappers
Azusa Pacific Cougars football players
Baltimore Ravens players
Green Bay Packers players
Jacksonville Jaguars players
Los Angeles Rams players
Miami Dolphins players
People from Menifee, California
Players of American football from California
Sportspeople from Riverside County, California
Tennessee Titans players